Wythall railway station serves the village of Wythall in Worcestershire, England.  The station, and all trains serving it, are operated by West Midlands Trains.

Although situated just outside the West Midlands county, the station lies within the area supported by Transport for West Midlands given its proximity to Tidbury Green, and therefore TfWM-issued tickets for train travel are valid for travel to the station. TfWM-issued bus tickets are not valid. London Midland closed the ticket office in 2011.

The station opened as Grimes Hill Platform on 1 July 1908. It then became Grimes Hill & Wythall Halt on 12 July 1914; Grimes Hill and Wythall Platform on 11 July 1927; the suffix was dropped on 9 July 1934 and it finally became Wythall on 6 May 1974.

Services

There is also an hourly Sunday service in each direction, to  & Stratford.

References

External links

Rail Around Birmingham and the West Midlands: Wythall station

Railway stations in Worcestershire
DfT Category E stations
Former Great Western Railway stations
Railway stations in Great Britain opened in 1908
Railway stations served by West Midlands Trains
1908 establishments in England